Mibambwe IV Rutarindwa (?? – December 1896, Marangara province, Nyanza, German East Africa) was Mwami of Rwanda between November 1895 and December 1896, having been made co-ruler by his father Kigeli IV Rwabugiri in 1889. Rutarindwa is sometime transcribed Rutalindwa.

Rule 
His adopted father, Kigeli IV Rwabugiri, had proclaimed him co-ruler in 1889, effectively designating him his successor. On Rwabugiri's unexpected death in 1895 while on an expedition in modern-day Democratic Republic of the Congo, he was proclaimed king.

Rwandan Queen Mothers were politically powerful. Rutarindwa's mother had died and, consequently, Rwabugiri appointed another of his wives, Kanjogera, as his surrogate mother. With the death of Rwabugiri, she and her brothers plotted to put her own young son Musinga, the future king Yuhi V Musinga, on the throne. This culminated in late 1896 in a battle between the King's and the Queen Mother's factions called the Rucunshu Coup, named for the hill that Rutarindwa had moved his court to. After the battle, Rutarindwa committed suicide, and the royal drum was destroyed when his house was burnt down.

References

Year of birth missing
1896 deaths
Rwandan kings
19th-century monarchs in Africa
1890s suicides
Suicides in Africa